Robert McGowan Coventry or Robert McGown Coventry  (1855–1914) was a Scottish painter born in Glasgow.

Biography
Coventry studied at the Glasgow School of Art under Robert Greenlees and in Paris. Although he traveled much to the continent and the Middle East, many of his paintings depict quayside and highland scenes from eastern Scotland. He used the signature "R M G COVENTRY". His daughter, Gertrude Mary was also an artist, known for her portrait paintings.

In 1889 Coventry became a member of the Royal Scottish Society of Painters in Watercolour and in 1906 he was elected an associate of the Royal Scottish Academy, RSA. He exhibited his marine and landscape paintings mainly at the RSA.

References

1855 births
1914 deaths
19th-century Scottish painters
20th-century Scottish painters
Artists from Glasgow
Alumni of the Glasgow School of Art
Royal Scottish Academicians
Scottish male painters
19th-century Scottish male artists
20th-century Scottish male artists